Lawrence Wilson (October 23, 1930 – August 16, 1979) was a Canadian professional ice hockey centre and coach. He played 152 games in the National Hockey League with the Detroit Red Wings and Chicago Black Hawks between 1950 and 1955, winning the Stanley Cup in his first season with Detroit in 1950. Wilson later became the interim head coach of the Red Wings during the 1976–77 season. He also coached in the minor leagues between 1968 and 1979. and 1978–79 seasons.

Personal life
Wilson was the father of former NHL player and head coach Ron Wilson. His older brother, Johnny Wilson, also played and coached in the NHL.

During the summer of 1979, he died of an apparent heart attack while jogging.

Career statistics

Regular season and playoffs

NHL coaching record

References

External links
 
Picture of Larry Wilson's Name on the 1950 Stanley Cup Plaque

1930 births
1979 deaths
Buffalo Bisons (AHL) players
Canadian ice hockey centres
Canadian ice hockey coaches
Chicago Blackhawks players
Dayton Gems players
Detroit Hettche players
Detroit Red Wings coaches
Detroit Red Wings players
Edmonton Flyers (WHL) players
Ice hockey people from Ontario
Ice hockey player-coaches
Indianapolis Capitals players
Omaha Knights (USHL) players
People from Bruce County
Southern Hockey League (1973–1977) coaches
Stanley Cup champions
Windsor Spitfires players